Frederick Strecker (1906–1976) was an international speedway rider from England.

Speedway career 
In 1930, when riding for Nottingham Strecker represented England against Australia.

In 1936, during the 1936 Provincial Speedway League season he finished third in the averages and won the 1936 Provincial Speedway League title with Southampton.

Personal life
His parents were German born and they changed their surname from to Streicher. After World War II, Fred was a motor car and metal dealer and also promoted stock car racing.

Players cigarette cards
Strecker is listed as number 44 of 50 in the 1930s Player's cigarette card collection.

References 

1906 births
1976 deaths
British speedway riders
Belle Vue Aces riders
Southampton Saints riders
Stoke Potters riders
Norwich Stars riders